Stockdale High School is the name of the following high schools in the United States:

Stockdale High School (Bakersfield, California)
Stockdale High School (Stockdale, Texas)